Jewelz is the second album by the rapper O.C. Unlike his debut, 1994's Word...Life, Jewelz features a wider number of guest producers and rappers. Producer DJ Premier (who also oversaw and mixed other parts of the album) lends his hand on four songs, while Buckwild, Da Beatminerz and O.Gee all drop three songs each. D.I.T.C. members Showbiz and Lord Finesse each contribute one number and as the album was released the production was highly praised for its clean, crispy but at the same time dark and menacing sound.

O.C. plays with a wide array of styles on the album, from the war-metaphor battle song "War Games" to abstract stories on the haunting "The Crow" and a very special history on a mystique woman that enters Credle's life in "Stronjay".  Though the differences between O.C.'s two first efforts are very noticeable many fans are constantly, and still, arguing which was the better album out of them.

This album, like his first, received strong reviews, but lacked in sales. He made his first appearance on the Billboard 200 album chart with the album, and also made his first appearance on the Billboard Hot 100 singles chart, with the single "Far From Yours". The album is now out of print.

As part of the concept for Jewelz, the CD was sold with different colored disc art inspired by the color palette of various jewels.

Critical reception

Matt Conaway from AllMusic praised O.C. for maintaining his "street-based" musicianship by having top-notch New York producers and rappers contribute quality work throughout the record and delivering strong lyricism of his own, highlighting "My World" and "Dangerous" as examples. Vibe contributor Noah Callahan-Bever also gave praise to the album's production team for emitting an aura of "melodic contentment" for O.C.'s more naturalistic flow to deliver solid rhymes on "Dangerous" and the title track, despite "Far From Yours" being the only dud, concluding that: "Thankfully, O.C. is still concerned with the decline of rap music, only now he's stopped criticizing and has started to lead by example, unveiling one of his most finely polished Jewelz this year has seen."

Track listing

Samples credits 
"My World" samples "Killer's Lullaby" by Barry White.
"War Games" samples "It's My Thing" by Marva Whitney.
"Can't Go Wrong" samples "American Tango" by Weather Report.
"The Chosen One" samples "White Clouds" by Hiroshi Fukumura and Sadao Watanabe.
"Dangerous" samples "Daisy Lady" by 7th Wonder.
"Far From Yours" samples "Tomorrow" by The Brothers Johnson.
"M.U.G." samples "The Saddest Thing of All" by Michel Legrand.
"The Crow" samples "Zen-Gun" by Ryuichi Sakamoto.
"You & Yours" samples "A Garden of Peace" by Lonnie Liston Smith.
"Hypocrite" samples "Sensitize" by Roy Ayers.
"It's Only Right" samples "Do You Like It" by B.T. Express.
"Jewelz" samples "Changing Faces" by J.J. Band and "I'll Take Time" by John Kasandra.

Album singles

Personnel
Adapted credits from the liner notes of Jewelz.

 Patrick Moxey - executive producer
 Mr. Dave - executive producer
 Eddie Sancho - engineering
 Max Vargas - engineering
 Norty Cotto - engineering
 Tony Smalios - engineering
 Chris Conway - engineering
 Kieran Walsh - engineering
 Michael Gilbert - engineering

 DJ Premier - mixing
 Ogee - mixing
 Buckwild - mixing
 Da Beatminerz - mixing
 Showbiz - mixing
 Lord Finesse - mixing
 Tony Dawsey - mastering
 Danny Clinch - photography
 Gregory Burke - art direction, design

Album chart positions

Singles chart positions

References

1997 albums
O.C. (rapper) albums
Albums produced by Buckwild
Albums produced by Da Beatminerz
Albums produced by DJ Premier
Albums produced by Lord Finesse